Let Me Die a Woman is a 1978 semidocumentary film concerning the lives of transgender people, directed and produced by the exploitation film auteur Doris Wishman.

Plot
The film contains interviews with the gender dysphoria pundit and caregiver Dr. Leo Wollman as well as transgender people, including the transgender rights activist Deborah Hartin. Between the interviews, there are staged dramatizations of the interviewees' experiences.

Reception
DVD Talk said of the film, "jaw-droppingly divine, completely original and purposefully obtuse, Let Me Die a Woman has long been the Mount Everest of many a Wishman fan. Who knew finding it and finally climbing it would be so remarkably rewarding."

See also
 List of transgender characters in film and television
 "Mr. Garrison's Fancy New Vagina", a South Park episode which used footage from the documentary during a sex change operation sequence.

References

External links 
 
 

1978 films
1970s English-language films
Transgender-related documentary films
1978 LGBT-related films
American sexploitation films
Films directed by Doris Wishman
1970s exploitation films
1978 documentary films
American LGBT-related films
Films about trans women
1970s American films